Tom Hidley (born 27 May 1931) is an American recording studio designer and audio engineer whose companies have been responsible for the design of hundreds of professional studios worldwide since 1965. Hidley coined the term "bass trap", and is credited with a number of recording studio design innovations, including soffit-mounted monitor speakers, and sliding glass doors between live and isolations rooms.

Career

Background and early career
As a teenager, Hidley spent long hours playing the saxophone, clarinet, and flute, until ordered by his physician to cease after suffering a physical breakdown. Turning to other music-related activities, Hidley began working at loudspeaker and tape-machine companies while recording at clubs after-hours. By 1956, he was working for JBL Loudspeaker Co. and performing audio engineering of custom installations, including installations in the homes of Frank Sinatra, Ella Fitzgerald, Lucille Ball, and Danny Kaye.

In 1959, "Madman Muntz" hired Hidley to assist in the development of the first car stereo. Among the first to own a Muntz car stereo was Frank Sinatra, and through Sinatra's purchase, Hidley became known to a Sinatra associate Val Valentin, who invited Hildley to assist in the building of the MGM/Verve recording studios in New York in 1962. Two years later, Phil Ramone hired Hidley as the audio technical manager of A & R Recording. Also employed by A & R at that time was Ami Hadani, and in 1965, Hidley and Hadani left A & R and moved to Los Angeles, where together they founded TTG Studios.

During his time at A & R, Hidley had begun to experiment with building monitor speakers whose frequency range extended to lower frequencies than the available speakers of the time. At TTG, Hidley modified an 8-track recorder to create one of the first 16-track, 2-inch tape recorders in the world. In 1968, after visiting Hidley's studio with Animals frontman Eric Burdon, Jimi Hendrix excitedly told Record Plant founders Gary Kellgren and Chris Stone about how great the studio sounded. Kellgren and Stone visited TTG and were so impressed with Hidley that they contracting Hidley to design a new Record Plant studio in Los Angeles. Record Plant West opened in December 1969, with Hidley becoming director of technical operations for all Record Plant locations. Hidley's studio design innovations continued, including the drum booth and the use of sliding glass doors to separate isolation booths from live rooms.

Westlake Audio and Eastlake Audio

While at Record Plant, Hidley also began selling pro audio equipment system packages from the garage of his home in Westlake Village, naming the company Westlake Audio. In 1971, Hidley partnered with Glenn Phoenix and Paul Ford to open Westlake Audio on Wilshire Boulevard. Westlake specialized in selling complete recording studio packages, including not only the design and construction of a studio space, as well as all of the related pro audio equipment, including a line of Hidley-designed speakers. Westlake was highly influential in standardizing acoustic design in the recording industry, with prospective studio clients commonly seeking out "Westlake rooms."

His partners unanimously opposed the idea, so Hidley sold his share of Westlake and founded Eastlake Audio in Switzerland, where he continued to design studios and sell monitor speakers. Sierra Audio, a sister company to Kent Duncan's Burbank recording studio Kendun Recorders, was formed to represent Eastlake Audio in the Western Hemisphere, South America and the Pacific.

Hidley Designs
In 1980, Hidley sold Eastlake and moved to Hawaii, intending to retire, but when Harumitsu Machijiri wanted Hidley to design Sedic Studios' new facilities in Tokyo, Japan, Hidley accepted under the condition that he would design and build two rooms: the first a Westlake/Eastlake design, and the second a new, improved design. Once built, the better-sounding room would be kept, while the other would be demolished and rebuilt to match the better-sounding room. Machijiri agreed, and Hidley worked with former Pioneer speaker designer Shio Kinoshita on the project. Inspired by his new "Non-Environment" control room concepts, Hidley returned to both the studio design business and Switzerland, where he founded Hidley Designs in 1986.

In 2005, Hidley and his wife relocated to Australia to retire.

References

External links
 Tom Hidley: Designing a Palace (video interview)

Living people
American acoustical engineers
1931 births